Mirny is a rural locality (a settlement) and the administrative center of Mirnoye Rural Settlement, Novonikolayevsky District, Volgograd Oblast, Russia. The population was 673 as of 2010. There are 15 streets.

Geography 
Mirny is located in steppe, on the Khopyorsko-Buzulukskaya Plain, 49 km northeast of Novonikolayevsky (the district's administrative centre) by road. Sapozhok is the nearest rural locality.

References 

Rural localities in Novonikolayevsky District